A Fool There Was is an American silent drama film produced by William Fox, directed by Frank Powell, and starring Theda Bara. Released in 1915, the film was long considered controversial for such risqué intertitle cards as "Kiss me, my fool!"

A Fool There Was is one of the few extant films featuring Theda Bara. It popularised the word vamp (short for vampire), which describes a femme fatale who causes the moral degradation of those she seduces, first fascinating and then exhausting her victims.

In 2015, the United States Library of Congress selected the film for preservation in the National Film Registry, finding it "culturally, historically, or aesthetically significant".

Plot
John Schuyler (Edward José), a rich Wall Street lawyer and diplomat, is a husband and a devoted family man. He is sent to England on a diplomatic mission without his wife and daughter. On the ship he meets the "Vampire woman" (Theda Bara)-a psychic vampire described as "a woman of the vampire species"-who uses her charms to seduce men, only to leave after ruining their lives. Schuyler is yet another one of her victims who falls completely under her control. In the process of succumbing to her will, he abandons his family, loses his job, his social standing, and becomes a raving drunkard. All attempts by his family to get him to return fail and the hapless "fool" plunges ever deeper into physical and mental degradation.

Cast

 Edward José as The Husband 
 Theda Bara as The Vampire 
 May Allison as The Wife's Sister 
 Clifford Bruce as The Friend 
 Victor Benoit as One of Her Victims 
 Frank Powell as The Doctor 
 Minna Gale as The Doctor's Fiancée
 Runa Hodges as The Child 
 Mabel Frenyear as The Wife

Basis
The film is based on the 1909 Broadway production A Fool There Was by Porter Emerson Browne, who in turn based his play on Rudyard Kipling's poem The Vampire. Katharine Kaelred played the role of seductress, billed as "The Woman". The star of the play was Victorian matinee idol Robert C. Hilliard, whose name featured prominently in some advertisements for the movie though he had no connection with the film.

Production

The producers were keen to pay tribute to their literary source, having a real actor read the full poem to the audience before each initial showing, and presenting passages of the poem throughout the film in intertitles. Bara's official credit is even "The Vampire", and for this reason the film is sometimes cited as the first "vampire" movie. However, in the film as in Kipling's poem, the term is used metaphorically as the character is not literally a vampire.

The film was the first on-screen appearance of World War I-era film actress May Allison (1890 – 1989).

While the film contains scenes ostensibly set in England and Italy, the entire movie was actually filmed in St. Augustine, Florida.

Release
The film was also a watershed in early film publicity. At a press conference in January 1915, the studio gave an elaborate fictional biography of Theda Bara, making her an exotic Arabian actress, and presented her in a flamboyant fur outfit. Then they made an intentional leak to the press that the whole thing was a hoax. This may have been one of Hollywood's first publicity stunts.

Although part of the film takes place in the United Kingdom, the film was not approved by the British Board of Film Censors, per its policy of rejecting films with illicit sexual relationships. Although A Fool There Was never received a public showing in Great Britain, later Theda Bara films were allowed.

Commentary
The film has been said to be unusual for the period in that the Husband does not experience a redemption, even when he hears the cries of his daughter, nor is the Vampire ever punished for destroying a family.

Preservation
A Fool There Was is one of the few Theda Bara films in existence, with copies at the Museum of Modern Art, BFI National Archive, and other film archives. The other surviving Bara films are The Stain (1914), East Lynne (1916), The Unchastened Woman (1925), and two short comedies that she made for Hal Roach in the mid-1920s.

Legacy
In 1938, Tex Avery released a cartoon called A Feud There Was.

The film is recognized by American Film Institute in these lists:
 2002: AFI's 100 Years...100 Passions – Nominated
 2003: AFI's 100 Years...100 Heroes & Villains:
 The Vampire – Nominated Villain

References

References

External links

 
 
 
 
 Actor Robert C. Hilliard recites some passages from the play in a recording made in 1911 

1915 films
1915 drama films
American silent feature films
Silent American drama films
American black-and-white films
American films based on plays
Films based on poems
Films based on works by Rudyard Kipling
Films shot in Fort Lee, New Jersey
Films shot in Florida
Films directed by Frank Powell
Articles containing video clips
United States National Film Registry films
Films based on adaptations
Fox Film films
Surviving American silent films
1910s American films